The 10th Ohio Cavalry Regiment was a cavalry regiment that served in the Union Army during the American Civil War.

Service
The 10th Ohio Cavalry Regiment was organized at Camp Taylor in Cleveland, Ohio, in October 1862 and mustered in for a three years under the command of Colonel Charles C. Smith.  Companies were mustered in beginning in December 1862 and continuing through July 1863.  Companies A and M were mustered in at Camp Chase in Columbus, Ohio.

The regiment was attached to 2nd Brigade, 2nd Cavalry Division, Army of the Cumberland, to August, 1863. 3rd Brigade, 2nd Division, Cavalry Corps, Army of the Cumberland, to November 1863. 2nd Brigade, 2nd Division, Cavalry Corps, Army of the Cumberland, to April 1864. 2nd Brigade, Kilpatrick's 3rd Division, Cavalry Corps, Army of the Cumberland, to October 1864. 2nd Brigade, 3rd Division, Cavalry Corps, Military Division Mississippi, to June 1865. Department of North Carolina to July 1865.

The 10th Ohio Cavalry mustered out of service July 24, 1865, at Lexington, North Carolina.

Detailed service
The 10th Ohio Volunteer Cavalry's detailed service is as follows:

1863
Left Ohio for Nashville, Tenn., February 27, 1863. Duty at Murfreesboro until June 1863. Expedition to Auburn, Snow Hill, Liberty, etc., April 2–6. Smith's Ford April 2. Snow Hill, Woodbury, April 3. Scout to Smithville June 4–5. Snow Hill June 4. Smithville June 5. Scout on Salem Pike June 12. Tullahoma Campaign June 23-July 7. Occupation of middle Tennessee until August 16. Passage of Cumberland Mountains and Tennessee River and Chickamauga Campaign August 16-September 22. Battle of Chickamauga September 19–21. Operations against Wheeler and Roddy September 30-October 17. McMinnville October 4. Farmington October 7. March to relief of Knoxville November 27-December 8. Near Loudon December 2. Expedition to Murphey, N.C., December 6–11. Near Dandridge December 22–23 (detachment). Dandridge December 24 (detachment). Mossy Creek, Talbot Station, December 29.

1864
Schulz's Mill, Cosby Creek, January 14, 1864 (detachment). Near Wilsonville January 22, 1864. Expedition to Quallatown, N.C., January 31-February 7 (detachment). Quallatown February 5. Scout from Ringgold, Ga., to Lafayette April 24–25. Atlanta Campaign May 1 to September 8. Stone Church May 1. Lee's Cross Roads and Ringgold Gap May 2. Demonstrations on Resaca May 8–13. Sugar Valley May 11. Near Resaca May 13. Battle of Resaca May 14–15. Rome May 17–18. Battles about Dallas, New Hope Church, and Allatoona Hills May 25-June 5. Near Stilesboro June 9 (detachment). Operations about Marietta and against Kennesaw Mountain June 10-July 2. On line of the Chattahoochie River July 3–17. Siege of Atlanta July 22-August 25. Frogtown August 3. Lovejoy's Station August 10. Sandtown and Fairburn August 15. Kilpatrick's Raid around Atlanta July 18–22. Camp Creek August 18. Red Oak and Jonesboro August 19. Lovejoy's Station August 20. Claiborne August 24. Flank movement on Jonesborough August 25–30. Fairburn August 27–28. Red Oak August 28. Flint River Station and Jonesborough August 30. Battle of Jonesboro August 31-September 1. Lovejoy's Station September 2–6. Campbellton September 10. Operations against Hood in northern Georgia and northern Alabama September 30-November 3. Camp Creek September 30. Sweetwater and Noyes Creek near Powder Springs October 2–3. Van Wert October 9–10, Dallas October 21. March to the sea November 10-December 15. Bear Creek Station November 16. Walnut Creek and East Macon November 20. Waynesboro November 27–28. Buckhead Creek or Reynolds' Plantation November 28. Louisville November 30. Waynesboro December 4. Ebenezer Creek December 8. Siege of Savannah December 10–21.

1865
Campaign of the Carolinas January to April 1865. Aiken and Blackville, S.C., February 11. North Edisto River February 12–13. Guenter's Bridge February 14. Phillips' Cross Roads, N.C., March 4. Rockingham March 7–8. Monroe's Cross Roads March 10. Taylor's Hole Creek, Averysboro, March 16. Battle of Bentonville March 19–21. Raleigh April 12–13. Morrisville April 13. Bennett's House April 26. Surrender of Johnston and his army. Duty in the Department of North Carolina until July.

Casualties
The regiment lost a total of 201 men during service; 3 officers and 34 enlisted men killed or mortally wounded, 1 officer and 158 enlisted men died of disease.

Commanders
 Colonel Charles C. Smith
 Colonel Thomas Wakefield Sanderson

Notable members
 1st Lieutenant David L. Cockley, Company L – Medal of Honor recipient for action at the Battle of Waynesboro, Georgia, December 4, 1864

See also
 List of Ohio Civil War units
 Ohio in the Civil War

Notes

References

External links
 Ohio in the Civil War: 10th Ohio Cavalry by Larry Stevens
 Regimental flag of the 10th Ohio Cavalry
 The Papers of Joshua D. Breyfogle at Dartmouth College Library

Military units and formations established in 1862
Military units and formations disestablished in 1865
Units and formations of the Union Army from Ohio
1862 establishments in Ohio